The First Mortgage Company Building is a historic fifteen-story building in El Paso, Texas. It was built for the First Mortgage Company in 1921, at a cost of $411,000. El Paso was going through a construction boom at the time, and it was the largest structure with the El Paso Scottish Rite Temple. It has been listed on the National Register of Historic Places since June 13, 1978.

References

Buildings and structures completed in 1920
Buildings and structures in El Paso, Texas
National Register of Historic Places in El Paso County, Texas